In distributed systems, observability is the ability to collect data about programs execution, internal states of modules, and the communication between components. To improve observability, software engineers use a wide range of logging and tracing techniques to gather telemetry information, and tools to analyze and use it.

Etymology, terminology and definition 
The term is borrowed from control theory, where the "observability" of a system measures how well its state can be determined from its outputs. Similarly, software observability measures how well a system's state can be understood from the obtained telemetry (metrics, logs, traces, profiling).

The definition of observability varies by vendor:

The term is frequently referred to as its numeronym O11y (where 11 stands for the number of letters between the first letter and the last letter of the word). This is similar to other computer science abbreviations such as i18n and L10n.

Observability vs. monitoring 

Observability and monitoring are sometimes used interchangeably. As tooling, commercial offerings and practices evolved in complexity, "monitoring" was re-branded as observability in order to differentiate new tools from the old.

The terms are commonly contrasted in that systems are monitored using predefined sets of telemetry, and monitored systems may be observable.

Majors et. al. suggest that engineering teams that only have monitoring tools end up relying on expert foreknowledge (seniority), whereas teams that have observability tools rely on exploratory analysis (curiosity).

Telemetry types 
Observability relies on three main types of telemetry data: metrics, logs and traces. Those are often referred to as "pillars of observability".

Metrics 

Application developers choose what kind of metrics to instrument their software with before it is released. Examples of common metrics include: 
 number of HTTP requests per second;
 total number of query failures;
 database size in bytes;
 time in seconds since last garbage collection.

Monitoring tools are typically configured to emit alerts when certain metric values exceed set thresholds. Thresholds are set based on knowledge about normal operating conditions and experience.

Metrics have limitations: when a previously unknown issue is encountered, it is impossible to add new metrics without shipping new code. Furthermore, their cardinality can quickly explode the size of telemetry data.

Logs

Traces

Continuous profiling 

Continuous profiling is another telemetry type used to precisely determine how an applications consumes resources.

"Pillars of observability" 
Metrics, logs and traces are most commonly listed as the pillars of observability. Majors et. al. suggest that the pillars of observability are high cardinality, high-dimensionality, and explorability.

See also 
 Application performance management (APM)
 Site reliability engineering (SRE)

Bibliography

References 

Distributed computing